Sean Michael Waltman (born July 13, 1972) is an American professional wrestler currently signed to WWE under a legends contract. He is best known for his appearances for the World Wrestling Federation (WWF, now WWE) under the ring names 1–2–3 Kid and X-Pac, World Championship Wrestling (WCW) as Syxx, and NWA Total Nonstop Action (NWA-TNA) as Syxx-Pac and Sean Waltman.

Waltman began his career in the WWF in 1993, where he performed under several monikers as a jobber, until he was branded the 1-2-3 Kid after an upset victory over Razor Ramon on Raw. As 1-2-3 Kid, he held the WWF Tag Team Championship twice and challenged Bret Hart for the WWF World Heavyweight Championship in July 1994 in what was ranked by WWE as the third-best match ever aired on Raw. During this time, he was part of The Kliq, a backstage group that was known for their influence on WWF storylines in the 1990s.

During the Monday Night Wars, Waltman left the WWF in 1996 to join Kliq members Kevin Nash and Scott Hall (formerly known as Razor Ramon) as Syxx in WCW, and held the WCW World Tag Team Championship with them as part of the New World Order (nWo), as well as becoming a one-time WCW Cruiserweight Champion. After being released from WCW in 1998, he returned to the WWF during its Attitude Era, where he was re-branded as D-Generation X (DX) member X-Pac and held the WWF Light Heavyweight Championship and WWF European Championship twice each, while also holding the WWF Tag Team Championship two more times while paired with Kane. After WCW went out of business in 2001, X-Pac held the WCW Cruiserweight and WWF Light Heavyweight Championships simultaneously during The Invasion, before departing the company after a brief nWo reunion the following year. He subsequently performed sporadically for several promotions, notably TNA (where he became a one-time TNA X Division Champion), and on the independent circuit, until he announced his retirement in 2019. He returned to the ring in 2022.

Waltman has won a dozen championships between WWE, WCW, and TNA, the majority being cruiserweight and tag team titles. He is the only wrestler to have held the TNA X Division Championship, the WCW Cruiserweight Championship, and the WWF Light Heavyweight Championship. He was the final WWF Light Heavyweight Champion before the title was retired in favor of the Cruiserweight Championship he simultaneously held. He is recognized by WWE as the only wrestler to have been "an active member of both the nWo and DX during their heydays" in the 1990s. Additionally, he is a two-time WWE Hall of Fame inductee and the only inductee to be inducted two years in a row (2019 and 2020) as a member of DX and the nWo respectively.

Early life
Sean Michael Waltman was born in Minneapolis on July 13, 1972. He had a self-described troubled childhood. He was raised by a single mother and has called himself "unsupervised from age five". He claimed he was molested several times as a child. He joined his school wrestling team in ninth grade, but quickly quit when they told him he needed to cut his hair in order to wrestle. He soon dropped out of school entirely. A love of professional wrestling and limited career opportunities led to him working in local wrestling promotions for free, setting up rings and doing other odd jobs before eventually wrestling himself.

Professional wrestling career

Early career (1989–1993)
After training under Boris Malenko, Joe Malenko, Masami Soronaka, and Karl Gotch, Waltman began his career as "The Lightning Kid". He worked his way through various independent promotions, including Pro Wrestling America (PWA) and the Global Wrestling Federation (GWF), winning the PWA Light Heavyweight title, the PWA Iron Horse TV Title and the GWF Light Heavyweight Championship. During this time, Waltman worked extensively with Jerry Lynn in North America and Japan. They often wrestled each other, but also teamed up to win the PWA Tag Team titles twice in 1993. While working for Larry Sharpe and Dennis Coralluzzo's WWA Promotion on November 28, 1992 in Clementon, New Jersey his opponent "The Kamikaze Kid" Bill Wilcox overshot a suicide dive and landed on Waltman's head, driving it to the concrete and causing a blood clot near his brain. He was hospitalized for three days, could not work for four months, and was advised to give up wrestling completely. He also appeared in New Japan Pro-Wrestling's Top of the Super Juniors in 1993, facing the likes of Chris Benoit, Eddie Guerrero and Jushin Liger.

World Wrestling Federation (1993–1996)

Early appearances (1993–1995) 

As The Lightning Kid, Waltman had his WWF tryout match in Phoenix, Arizona in April 1993, the day after WrestleMania IX, against fellow hopeful Louie Spicolli (soon known as Rad Radford in the WWF). He reminisced that he was lucky to have an opponent with a vested interest in an impressive match, rather than (as was then typical) a disinterested WWF veteran jobber like Virgil or Jim Powers. After earning a contract, he made his television debut as "The Kamikaze Kid" on Monday Night Raw on May 3, losing to Doink the Clown. He quickly became "The Cannonball Kid", losing to Mr. Hughes. He then became simply "The Kid", scoring an upset pinfall on Razor Ramon on the May 17, 1993 episode of Monday Night Raw, thus becoming "The 1–2–3 Kid". Razor challenged him to a rematch, wagering $2,500, then $5,000 and finally $10,000 of his own money. Kid accepted the challenge, but grabbed the money and ran from the arena during the match. Ted DiBiase, who was feuding with Razor, taunted him over losing to a nobody.

This angered Kid, and led to a match in which he upset DiBiase as well. Razor turned face shortly after and took Kid under his wing. The 1–2–3 Kid made his pay-per-view debut at SummerSlam, losing to DiBiase's tag partner Irwin R. Schyster after Razor had defeated DiBiase. At Survivor Series, Kid was on Razor's team in a four-on-four elimination match. He and Marty Jannetty were the sole survivors, which led to them forming a tag team and holding the WWF Tag Team Championship for a week in January 1994 after beating The Quebecers.

For the next two years, The 1–2–3 Kid was a natural underdog and fan favorite. He wrestled Bret Hart in an unusually long (for the time) match for the WWF Championship on July 11, 1994 on Raw and had another brief (one-day) tag title reign in January 1995, with Bob Holly beating Bam Bam Bigelow and Tatanka at the Royal Rumble before losing to The Smoking Gunns the next day on Raw.

Million Dollar Corporation (1995–1996) 

After Kid and Razor failed to win the Tag Team Championship from Billy Gunn and Bart Gunn in October 1995, Kid attacked the face Gunns after the match to tease a heel turn. On the Raw before Survivor Series in November, he was the guest referee in a match between Razor Ramon and Sycho Sid. As Razor attempted his finisher, The Razor's Edge, Kid pulled Sid down from Razor, allowing Sid to then hit Razor with his Powerbomb, and Kid fast-counted the pinfall, thus turning heel. At SummerSlam, he lost to Hakushi but won a rematch in November after Ted DiBiase interfered. He was the sole survivor of his team at Survivor Series, besting rival Marty Jannetty. Razor and Marty would team up to beat Kid and Sid at In Your House 5. After Survivor Series, Kid joined Ted DiBiase's Million Dollar Corporation faction. He remained with the group until May 1996 when Waltman left the WWF. He lost a "Crybaby match" to Razor Ramon at In Your House 6. The 1–2–3 Kid's final WWF match aired on the May 20 episode of Monday Night Raw; he lost to Savio Vega. Notably, Waltman was the only Kliq member not involved in the infamous "Curtain Call" that took place at Madison Square Garden the night before his final match from his first WWF run aired, as he was in drug rehab at the time.

World Championship Wrestling (1996–1998) 

On September 16, 1996, Waltman was shown sitting in the front row for a live episode of Nitro. Later that night, he used a remote control to release New World Order (nWo) propaganda from the ceiling, revealing himself as the newest member of the recently formed faction. He was called "Syxx", because he was the sixth member of the nWo, and six is the sum of numbers in "1–2–3 Kid". In his first major angle, Syxx stole Eddie Guerrero's WCW United States Heavyweight Championship belt, leading to a ladder match for the title at Souled Out in January 1997, which Syxx lost. The next month, at SuperBrawl VII, Syxx pinned Dean Malenko for the WCW Cruiserweight Championship, after hitting him with the title belt, which he had grabbed from Guerrero at ringside. In June 1997, he lost the championship to Chris Jericho at a webcast house show in Los Angeles, California, minutes after successfully defending against Rey Mysterio, Jr.

During a feud with Ric Flair, and a loss to him at Road Wild in August, Syxx disparagingly portrayed Flair as part of an nWo segment parodying his Four Horsemen group. This segment led to a WarGames match at Fall Brawl, where Syxx, Kevin Nash, Buff Bagwell and Konnan defeated The Four Horsemen (Flair, Steve McMichael, Chris Benoit and Curt Hennig) after Hennig betrayed the Horsemen and joined the nWo. In mid-1997, the nWo invoked "Wolfpac Rules", allowing Syxx to replace the injured Kevin Nash in defending the WCW World Tag Team Championship with Scott Hall. On October 13, 1997, Hall and Syxx lost the title to The Steiner Brothers (Rick and Scott). In October, a neck injury sidelined Waltman from wrestling, but he continued to appear on television for several weeks after. While later recuperating at home, he was fired via Federal Express by WCW President Eric Bischoff. Waltman claims this was a power play aimed at his friends Hall and Nash, whose backstage influence was felt as a threat. Bischoff later said Waltman was a competent performer when sober, but sober periods were "few and far between", and "in many ways, Sean was lucky to even have a job".

World Wrestling Federation / World Wrestling Entertainment (1998–2002)

D-Generation X (1998–2000) 

Waltman returned to WWF television on the March 30, 1998 episode of Monday Night Raw, the night after WrestleMania XIV and days after his firing from WCW. With Shawn Michaels beginning a four-year retirement after a WWF World Heavyweight Championship loss and back injury, Triple H was now the leader of D-Generation X (D-X). He said he was forming a D-X army and "when you start an army, you look to your blood... you look to your buddies... you look to your friends... you look to The Kliq." Waltman appeared on the stage with a beard, commented on Bischoff and Hollywood Hogan, and said if they weren't contracted to WCW, Hall and Nash would have also returned to the WWF. Bischoff responded on Nitro the next week by telling Waltman to "bite me".

Initially called "The Kid" on the WWF website, he became known as "X-Pac" (which originated from his nickname "Syxx-Pac" based on his ring name "Syxx" in WCW) by the next Raw. X-Pac feuded with Jeff Jarrett, ultimately defeating him in a hair-vs-hair match at SummerSlam, then with WWF European Champion D'Lo Brown, whom he dethroned on September 21, 1998. He lost the title to Brown two weeks later, then won it again at Judgment Day: In Your House in October. Waltman lost the title to Shane McMahon on February 15, 1999. At WrestleMania XV, he lost a championship rematch when Triple H betrayed him, and hit him with his Pedigree finisher. X-Pac then sided with Road Dogg against Triple H, Chyna and Billy Gunn, after the temporary demise of D-X. X-Pac and Road Dogg wanted a reformed D-X to be about rebellion, while the others wanted it to be about making money. X-Pac befriended Kane, a mute, angry loner whom he partially socialized and encouraged to speak, through an electrolarynx. They won the WWF Tag Team Championship twice together. After D-X reunited in late 1999 as a heel group, X-Pac led Kane to believe he would be inducted into D-X, but instead betrayed him and eventually stole his new girlfriend, Tori. The rivalry between X-Pac and Kane culminated in a tag team match pitting X-Pac and Road Dogg against Kane and Rikishi at WrestleMania 2000.

Following WrestleMania, X-Pac continued to team with Road Dogg, with the duo competing against other tag teams including Edge and Christian, the Hardy Boyz, and Too Cool. In June 2000, X-Pac competed in the King of the Ring tournament, losing to Chris Benoit in the first round. At King of the Ring 2000, X-Pac, Road Dogg, and Tori defeated the Dudley Boyz in a dumpster match; during the bout, Tori was powerbombed through a table by the Dudley Boyz, marking the end of her affiliation with X-Pac. In August 2000, growing dissension between X-Pac and Road Dogg saw the two face one another at SummerSlam 2000, with X-Pac winning the bout following a low blow; after the match, Road Dogg attacked X-Pac, marking the end of their tag team and the dissolution of D-Generation X. In September 2000, X-Pac began feuding with Chris Jericho, with Jericho defeating X-Pac at Unforgiven 2000 and then again in a cage match at No Mercy 2000. During the feud, X-Pac sustained a neck injury when Jericho gave him a powerbomb, side-lining him for three months.

X-Factor; nWo reunion (2001–2002)

After returning from his neck injury in February 2001, X-Pac briefly feuded with Chris Jericho over the WWF Intercontinental Championship, culminating in a fatal four-way match with Chris Benoit and Eddie Guerrero at No Way Out in February, which Jericho won to retain the title.
In February, X-Pac formed a new stable called X-Factor with Justin Credible and Albert. During this time, he usually teamed with Credible, but also appeared in singles matches. He won the WWF Light Heavyweight Championship from Jeff Hardy on June 25, then won the WCW Cruiserweight Championship for the second time in his career when he defeated Billy Kidman on July 30. Despite the reign occurring during the WCW Invasion angle, where the WWF side was mostly portrayed as faces, the fans were vocal in their disapproval of Waltman during his reign. This fan disapproval, later known as "X-Pac heat", was acknowledged on-screen by both Alliance member Billy Kidman and, later by WWF member Edge.

When Credible joined the ECW/WCW Alliance X-Factor broke up. At SummerSlam, X-Pac defeated Tajiri to win the WWF Light Heavyweight Championship for the second time while WCW Cruiserweight Champion at the same time. X-Pac then feuded with Kidman and Tajiri. After losing the WCW Cruiserweight title to Kidman, he took time off for another injury. The WWF Light Heavyweight Championship was abandoned upon his return to television, though he defended it at several house shows shortly prior. Hall, Nash and Hogan returned to the WWF in 2002 as the New World Order, brought in by Vince McMahon. Hogan was kicked from the group after losing to The Rock at WrestleMania X8. X-Pac, who had been out with an injury, returned on the March 21 episode of SmackDown!, rejoined the nWo and attacked Hogan. He said he had been waiting four years to do so, because Hogan shot on WCW Thunder after Waltman's firing, saying he could not "cut the mustard". The storyline was dropped after the first WWF draft, when the nWo went to Raw and Hogan to SmackDown!. During the nWo's feud with Booker T and Goldust a botched spinebuster injured him and kept him from participating in the feud. On the July 8, 2002 episode of Raw, Waltman wrestled in his last WWE match, a ten-man tag. This match was also the end of the nWo angle, as Nash tore his quadriceps, and Vince McMahon disbanded the group a week later. At SummerSlam, Raw commentator Jim Ross announced WWE and Waltman had parted ways.

NWA Total Nonstop Action (2002, 2003) 
Waltman, as "Syxx-Pac", debuted for NWA Total Nonstop Action on September 18, 2002, losing a gauntlet match. Rejoining his WWF tag partners Scott Hall and B.G. James, he feuded with Jeff Jarrett and Brian Lawler. On October 9, 2002, Syxx-Pac made his X Division debut, defeating eight other wrestlers in a ladder match to win the vacant TNA X Division Championship. He held the title for two weeks before losing to A.J. Styles in a No Disqualification match. He abruptly left TNA after defeating Lawler in the first round of an NWA World Heavyweight Championship number one contender tournament on November 6. 

Waltman, as Syxx-Pac, returned to TNA for a single night on June 18, 2003, at their first anniversary pay-per-view, as A.J. Styles's mystery partner in a loss to Jeff Jarrett and Sting.

Xtreme Pro Wrestling (2003)
Waltman, as "X", debuted in Xtreme Pro Wrestling on February 28, 2003, winning the XPW Television Championship from Kaos. He retained the title in a bout with Juventud Guerrera on March 1, and held it until the promotion closed in March 2003.

NWA Total Nonstop Action (2005, 2006)
Under his real name, Waltman returned to TNA on February 13, 2005 at Against All Odds, attacking Jeff Jarrett during his NWA World Heavyweight Championship match with Kevin Nash. Nash, Waltman and Diamond Dallas Page formed an alliance and feuded with Planet Jarrett (Jarrett, The Outlaw and Monty Brown) and at Lockdown, Waltman, B.G. James and Diamond Dallas Page defeated Planet Jarrett in a Lethal Lockdown match. Nash and Page left TNA to focus on acting afterwards.

At Hard Justice in 2005, Waltman replaced Jeff Hardy, who no-showed, and lost to Raven in a Clockwork Orange House of Fun match after being back body dropped through the steel cage. On June 19, at Slammiversary, Waltman wrestled a five-man King of the Mountain match for the NWA World Heavyweight Championship. He lost, but cost defending champion A.J. Styles the title by delivering an X-Factor off a ladder. This turned him heel and led to a grudge match at No Surrender, which Styles won after guest referee Jerry Lynn prevented Waltman from cheating. Waltman challenged Lynn to a match at Sacrifice. After losing by victory roll, Waltman attacked Lynn and tried to reinjure his shoulder. Waltman then partnered with Alex Shelley to win the Chris Candido Cup. This earned them a shot at the NWA World Tag Team Championship at Unbreakable. Waltman, however, no-showed the event. He was not seen again until a one-night return at Final Resolution on January 15, 2006, brought in by Larry Zbyszko to defeat his rival, Raven.

Wrestling Society X (2006)
In February 2006, Waltman joined MTV's newly formed Wrestling Society X (WSX) promotion, as "6-Pac". At their inaugural tapings on February 9, 6-Pac had a ten-man hardcore battle royal ladder match, which both he and Vampiro won by climbing the ladder to retrieve WSX contracts. 6-Pac lost a WSX Championship title match to Vampiro the following week. He challenged Vampiro in episode four, as a ruse to introduce Ricky Banderas, who attacked Vampiro from behind. He later defeated Human Tornado and Scorpio Sky in singles matches, and teased an affair with Lizzy Valentine (the valet and girlfriend of Matt Sydal), though WSX folded before the angle could go on any further.

Independent circuit (2006–2010) 

Waltman, under his real name, defeated Adam Pearce for the NWA Heritage Championship in El Paso, Texas on April 21, 2007. He defended it against El Sicodelico Jr. on April 27, and lost it to Pearce two days later. On July 8, 2007, Waltman teamed with Billy Kidman in a three-way tag match in McAllen, Texas for the NWA World Tag Team Championship, which had been vacated by Team 3D after the NWA stopped working with TNA. They lost the match to Karl Anderson and Joey Ryan. On the May 14, 2008, episode of NWA Wrestling Showcase, Waltman challenged Pearce for the NWA World Heavyweight Championship. The match ended prematurely after Waltman legitimately injured his knee five minutes in. He was attacked by The Real American Heroes and Pearce, so won by disqualification. As wrestling titles can generally only change hands by pinfall or submission, Pearce retained the belt.

In June 2007, Waltman, as X-Pac, began working regularly for AAA, initially a member of Konnan's La Legión Extranjera (Foreign Legion) and managed by girlfriend Alicia Webb. He usually used the D-Generation X entrance music. After leaving for rehab in mid-2008, he returned at Verano de Escándalo (Summer of Scandal) that September, turning on the Foreign Legion and forming D-Generation Mex, a parody of D-Generation X, with Rocky Romero and Alex Koslov. He later feuded with one of AAA's top stars, El Zorro.

On August 8, 2009, at GLCW Slamfest, X-Pac became the new GLCW Heavyweight Champion by defeating Skull Crusher, who had replaced champion Al Snow when he failed to show.

Total Nonstop Action Wrestling (2010) 

On a special live, three-hour Monday night episode of Impact! on January 4, 2010, Waltman (as Syxx-Pac) and Scott Hall returned to TNA. That night, fellow former nWo member Hulk Hogan debuted in TNA. Kevin Nash, Hall and Waltman quickly reformed an alliance called The Band, but Hogan stayed away, saying times had changed. On the January 14 episode of Impact!, The Band attacked Robert Roode and James Storm with led to a tag team match at Genesis. At Genesis on January 17, Syxx-Pac replaced Hall and teamed with Nash to lose to Beer Money, Inc. (Robert Roode and James Storm). On the next Impact! Hogan, disgusted by The Band's actions, had security eject Syxx-Pac and Hall, saying they weren't contracted to TNA. They appeared the next week anyway, attacking Kurt Angle from behind. They returned a week later, betraying Nash and beating him down. on the February 11 episode of Impact!, Waltman and Hall attacked Kurt Angle until Hogan made the save. on the February 18 episode of Impact!, Waltman and Hall brawled with Nash and Young and a week later on the February 25 episode of Impact!, Waltman and Hall brawled with Nash and Young in the parking lot and left them laying. on the March 8 episode of Impact, Nash and Young brought out a contract to wrestle Waltman and Hall on PPV. on the March 15 episode of Impact, Nash and Hall had a 5-Min $25,000 challenge when Waltman attacked Nash and handcuffed him to the rope. At Destination X on March 21, Syxx-Pac and Hall wagered their TNA jobs in a tag match against Nash and Eric Young. In the end, Nash turned on Young and helped The Band win the match and full TNA contracts. On the March 29 Impact!, The Band lost a six-man steel cage tag match to Eric Young, Jeff Hardy and Rob Van Dam. on the April 12 episode of Impact, Waltman, Hall and Nash defeated Team 3D and Jesse Neal in a Street Fight. Syxx-Pac was scheduled for a tag match at Lockdown, but was replaced by Nash after the Missouri Athletic Commission barred Waltman from wrestling, due to his hepatitis C. On the April 26 Impact!, Waltman was written off of TV when Team 3D found Syxx-Pac on a backstage floor in a pool of blood; Eric Young took his place in The Band. In June 2010, TNA released Waltman and Hall.

Late career (2010–2019) 
On February 26, 2011, Waltman was inducted into the Legends Pro Wrestling Hall of Fame in Wheeling, West Virginia by Jack Blaze at their "LPW X-Factor 2011" event. On March 5, 2011, Waltman reunited with former D-Generation X members Road Dogg and Billy Gunn for a six-man tag match at a Pro Wrestling Syndicate show in Long Island, New York. A week later, X-Pac defeated UIW Lightweight Champion Stupid in a non-title match. 

On April 2, 2011, Waltman returned to WWE television to celebrate, with Kevin Nash and Triple H, their longtime friend Shawn Michaels' induction into the 2011 WWE Hall of Fame. He later worked backstage as a scout and evaluator in Florida Championship Wrestling, the WWE developmental territory. 

On April 15, 2011, Waltman, as The 1–2–3 Kid, debuted for Chikara by entering their King of Trios tournament, teaming with Arik Cannon and Darin Corbin (Team Minnesota). They were eliminated in the first round by Team Michinoku Pro (Dick Togo, Great Sasuke and Jinsei Shinzaki). The day after, Waltman defeated Amazing Red, Frightmare and Obariyon in a four-way elimination match to make it to the next day's Rey de Voladores tournament final. There, he lost to El Generico. After the match, Waltman said he believed 2011 would be his last year in professional wrestling, praising Chikara as the "future of wrestling" and thanking them for a memorable weekend. 

In October 2011, X-Pac teamed with Billy Gunn wrestled the Full Blooded Italians in the main event on a Caribbean Pro Wrestling show in Aguadilla, Puerto Rico. 

In March 2012, Waltman attended the Hall of Fame again, with The Kliq. On July 23, he, Billy Gunn and Road Dogg returned to join Shawn Michaels and Triple H for a D-Generation X reunion on the 1000th episode of Raw. 

In September 2012, the 1–2–3 Kid returned to Chikara for the 2012 King of Trios tournament, this time teaming with Aldo Montoya and Tatanka as Team WWF. On September 14, they lost their first-round match to The Extreme Trio (Jerry Lynn, Tommy Dreamer and Too Cold Scorpio). The next day, The 1–2–3 Kid was low-blowed and pinned by Mark Angelosetti. On the final day of the tournament weekend, The 1–2–3 Kid and Marty Jannetty won the annual tag team gauntlet match. 

On October 8 and 9, 2012, he wrestled in a Bad Boys of Wrestling Federation tournament to crown the BBWF Caribbean Champion. He defeated Krimson in the semi-final and Daivari in the final, winning the title. 

On November 18, 2012, The 1–2–3 Kid returned to Chikara, when he and Marty Jannetty defeated The Heart Throbs (Antonio Thomas and Romeo Roselli) to earn their third point (for three consecutive wins) and a shot at the Chikara Campeonatos de Parejas. They lost the title match on December 2, at the Under the Hood internet pay-per-view, to defending champions The Young Bucks (Matt and Nick Jackson). 

In early 2013, The Kliq/DX reunited for an episode of NXT. In March 2013, Waltman signed a WWE Legends contract (a long-term contract which gives WWE merchandising rights to a wrestler's name and likeness, requires occasional appearances and prevents them from working for competing major promotions, but allows for independent appearances). 

Waltman, under his real name, returned to Chikara on March 8, 2013, losing to Hallowicked. On March 23, 2013, in a four-way match at Jerry Lynn's retirement show in Minneapolis, X-Pac tore his anus by performing his signature Bronco Buster onto the exposed turnbuckle. Afterward, he went back to his hotel room, where he discovered a lot of blood coming out of his clothes and went to the hospital. He underwent a sphincteroplasty and was released the following morning. On November 9, 2013, X-Pac and Lance Storm lost to Tommy Dreamer and Terry Funk in the main event of House of Hardcore 3.  

On April 5, 2014 the night before WrestleMania XXX, Waltman joined Shawn Michaels, Triple H, and Kevin Nash at Scott Hall's WWE Hall of Fame induction, reuniting The Kliq. 

On June 14, 2014, X-Pac and Rikishi defeated Gangrel and Matt Striker at House of Hardcore 6. In September 2014, Waltman returned to Chikara to do commentary during the first round of the 2014 King of Trios. 

On the January 19, 2015 episode of Raw, labelled Raw Reunion, Damien Mizdow appeared with Kevin Nash, Shawn Michaels, Scott Hall and Triple H dressed as X-Pac, only for X-Pac to confront him (finding the impersonation funny), until The Miz interrupted them to tell them that Mizdow was only his stunt double, and that the party was over. He appeared again with Hall and Nash, being interrupted by The Ascension, who were attempting to attack them, only to be joined by The APA and The New Age Outlaws in fending off The Ascension. At WrestleMania 31, X-Pac along with the New Age Outlaws and Shawn Michaels helped Triple H win his match against Sting. They were backstage at NXT TakeOver: Brooklyn in August 2015. 

On September 4, 2016, Waltman, as X-Pac, made a surprise return to Chikara, representing DX alongside Billy Gunn in a tag team gauntlet match. The two entered the match as the final team and scored the win over Prakash Sabar and The Proletariat Boar of Moldova.

In January 2018, Waltman returned at WWE Raw 25 Years and reunited with DX and Scott Hall. In November 2018, he attended NXT TakeOver: WarGames.

Retirement (2019–2022) 
In 2019, Waltman was inducted into the WWE Hall of Fame (under the X-Pac name) as a member of D-Generation X alongside Triple H, Shawn Michaels, Road Dogg, Billy Gunn and the late Chyna. During WrestleMania 35 weekend in April 2019, X-Pac, Hurricane Helms and Jushin Thunder Liger won a six-man tag team match against Revolt! (Caleb Konley, Jake Manning, and Zane Riley) at the WrestleCon Mark Hitchcock Memorial SuperShow. Later in July, he claimed that the match would be his last and that he was retired, stating "I'm fucking done wrestling. I'm done." However, he did mention that he would be open to potential one-night returns for special occasions such as WrestleMania and NXT TakeOver. On December 9, 2019, it was announced that Waltman would be inducted into the WWE Hall of Fame a second time (this time under his real name) as a part of the class of 2020, this time as a member of the New World Order, together with fellow former nWo stablemates Hulk Hogan, Kevin Nash, and Scott Hall; this made him the first person to be inducted two years in a row, and the first to be inducted twice as part of teams or groups. The 2020 Hall of Fame ceremony was delayed due to the COVID-19 pandemic in the United States, it eventually took place a year later.

Game Changer Wrestling (2022–present) 
Waltman came out of retirement in February 2022, debuting in Game Changer Wrestling on its "Welcome to Heartbreak" pay-per-view in Los Angeles as the tag team partner of Joey Janela. The following month at the "Joey Janela's Spring Break 6" pay-per-view, Waltman lost to Janela.

Other media
In 2004, Waltman co-starred with then-girlfriend Chyna in the now-infamous amateur adult film 1 Night in China.

Waltman's has been a playable character in video games including WWF Raw, WCW vs. nWo: World Tour, WCW Nitro, WWF Attitude, WWF Smackdown!, WWF WrestleMania 2000, WWF No Mercy, WWF SmackDown! 2: Know Your Role, WWF With Authority!, WWF Road to WrestleMania, WWE SmackDown! Shut Your Mouth, WWF Raw, WWE '13, downloadable content in WWE 2K14 as Syxx-Pac, WWE 2K16, WWE 2K20, and WWE 2K22.

Starting in 2016, Waltman began hosting the weekly podcast, X-Pac 1, 2, 360. Waltman has also made various appearances on other podcasts including The Steve Austin Show, Talk Is Jericho, and The Ross Report.

Personal life
In the mid-2000s, Waltman was in a relationship with Joanie Laurer, who competed as Chyna in the WWF. They were engaged but later split up. In March 2005, Waltman appeared on the VH1 reality show The Surreal Life, in which he visited Laurer in an attempt to reconcile with her. After Laurer refused to reconcile, he was eventually ejected from the house by the other guests. On The Tomorrow Show with Keven Undergaro, he recounted the last time he saw Chyna. He has been open about past substance abuse issues; during his relationship with Laurer, he struggled with an addiction to methamphetamine and narcotics such as cocaine and prescription pain medication.

In 2008, Waltman attempted suicide in his Mexico City apartment. He later said he was so overcome with shame and guilt after a physical altercation with his then-girlfriend Alicia Webb that he consumed a mixture of pills and alcohol and hanged himself from his apartment balcony. Webb supposedly found him hanging and was able to get him down, reviving him until an ambulance arrived. Following this incident, he was placed in WWE-sponsored rehab and began his recovery.

On April 30, 2017, Waltman was arrested at the Los Angeles International Airport after allegedly being found in possession of methamphetamines. On May 26, however, it was announced that the charges had been dropped after lab results determined the pills he possessed were not methamphetamines nor any form of narcotic.

On September 24, 2018, Waltman announced the death of his ex-wife and the mother of his two children, Terry Waltman, to whom he was married from 1994 to 2002. He said she had "lost her battle with mental illness and addiction". He began dating author Angela Nissel in 2018. In 2022, Waltman became a grandfather.

Filmography

Championships and accomplishments 

 Bad Boys of Wrestling Federation
 BBFW Caribbean Championship (1 time)
 DDT Pro-Wrestling
 Ironman Heavymetalweight Championship (1 time)
 Great Lakes Championship Wrestling
 GLCW Heavyweight Championship (1 time)
 Global Wrestling Federation
 GWF Light Heavyweight Championship (2 times)
 GWF Light Heavyweight Championship Tournament (1991)
 Jersey Championship Wrestling
 JCW Tag Team Championships (1 time) – with Joey Janela
 Legends Pro Wrestling
 LPW Hall of Fame (2011)
 Metroplex Wrestling
 MPX Tag Team Champion (1 time) – with Jerome Daniels
 Mid-Eastern Wrestling Federation
 MEWF Light Heavyweight Championship (1 time)
 NWA Pro Wrestling
 NWA Heritage Championship (1 time)
 Pro Wrestling America
 PWA Iron Horse Television Championship (1 time)
 PWA Light Heavyweight Championship (2 times)
 PWA Tag Team Championship (1 time) – with Jerry Lynn
 Pro Wrestling Illustrated
 Comeback of the Year (1998)
 Tag Team of the Year (1999) – with Kane
 Ranked No. 21 of the top 500 singles wrestlers in the PWI 500 in 1997
 Ranked No. 177 of the top 500 singles wrestlers of the "PWI Years" in 2003
 South Eastern Wrestling Alliance
 SEWA Light Heavyweight Championship (1 time)
 Total Nonstop Action Wrestling
 TNA X Division Championship (1 time)
 Chris Candido Memorial Tag Team Tournament – with Alex Shelley
 World Championship Wrestling
 WCW Cruiserweight Championship (1 time)
 WCW World Tag Team Championship (1 time) – with Kevin Nash and Scott Hall1
 World Wrestling Federation/WWE
 WWF European Championship (2 times)
 WWF Light Heavyweight Championship (2 times, final)
 WCW Cruiserweight Championship (1 time)
 WWF Tag Team Championship (4 times) – with Marty Jannetty (1), Bob Holly (1), and Kane (2)
 Slammy Award (1 time)
 Biggest Heart (1994) 
 WWF World Tag Team Championship Tournament (1995) – with Bob Holly
 WWE Hall of Fame (2 times)
 Class of 2019 – as a member of D-Generation X
 Class of 2020 – as a member of the New World Order
 Xtreme Pro Wrestling
 XPW Television Championship (1 time)
 Wrestling Society X
 WSX Rumble (shared with Vampiro)
 Wrestling Observer Newsletter
 Best Gimmick (1996) – nWo
 Feud of the Year (1996) New World Order vs. World Championship Wrestling
1 – Following an injury to Nash, the nWo invoked "Wolfpac Rules" and named Syxx as co-champion

Luchas de Apuestas record

References

External links

 
 
 
 

1972 births
American male professional wrestlers
American podcasters
Bridgeport Bluefish guest managers
D-Generation X members
Expatriate professional wrestlers in Japan
Living people
Professional wrestlers from Minneapolis
Professional wrestling podcasters
Sportspeople from Minneapolis
The Kliq members
The Million Dollar Corporation members
New World Order (professional wrestling) members
WWE Hall of Fame inductees
WWF European Champions
20th-century professional wrestlers
21st-century professional wrestlers
TNA/Impact X Division Champions
WCW/WWE Cruiserweight Champions
Ironman Heavymetalweight Champions
GWF Light Heavyweight Champions
WCW World Tag Team Champions